Thomas Taylor Hammond (born May 10, 1944) is an American sportscaster. Hammond is primarily known for his work with NBC Sports from 1984 to the present. Hammond is one of the network's staple on-air presenters, along with Bob Costas and Dan Hicks. 

Hammond is best known for his coverage of Thoroughbred Racing on NBC, coverage of Notre Dame Football on NBC from 1992 to 2012 and his coverage of the NFL on NBC from 1985 to 2011.

Hammond also served as the play-by-play announcer for NBC's coverage of track and field at each Summer Olympics from 1992 to 2016. He also announced the speed skating events during the 2018 Winter Olympics.

Early career
Hammond earned a B.S. in animal science in 1967 from the University of Kentucky, specializing in equine genetics and following in the footsteps of his grandfather, Thomas Poe Cooper, a former dean of the UK College of Agriculture and a former Acting President of UK. He began his career with Lexington radio station WVLK, where he was news and sports director. In 1970 and for the next 10 years, he was sports director for WLEX-TV. In 1980, he was named a play-by-play announcer for Southeastern Conference basketball games.

Throughout the 1970s and 1980s, he served as a sales announcer at the Keeneland Thoroughbred Sales and at thoroughbred horse sales in 16 other states. He is recognized as a specialist and national expert on thoroughbred pedigrees.

Hammond was the lead play-by-play commentator for Southeastern Conference men's basketball broadcasts by TVS (1980–1983), SPI/Lorimar (1984–1986) and  Raycom Sports (formerly Lincoln Financial Sports and Jefferson Pilot Sports) from 1987 until 2009. Hammond had known his color commentator on the Lincoln Financial broadcasts, Larry Conley, since junior high school.

NBC Sports
Hammond's tenure at NBC began in 1984, when he was named as a co-host of the inaugural Breeders' Cup alongside Dick Enberg. It was supposed to be a one-shot deal for Hammond, but network execs were so impressed, he ended up getting a long-term contract.  He was the main host of the network's thoroughbred racing coverage until Mike Tirico took over in 2017.

Hammond's duties at NBC expanded to covering many other sports. He was the network's play-by-play voice for its coverage of Notre Dame football alongside analyst Mike Mayock. He was also the lead play-by-play man for The AFL on NBC. Hammond also has been very much involved in NBC's Olympic Games coverage. At the Summer Olympics, Hammond served as the chief commentator for track and field, a position for which he debuted at the 1992 Summer Olympics in Barcelona, where his broadcast partner that year was O. J. Simpson.  Hammond has since said that, prior to the O. J. Simpson murder case, he and Simpson were great friends and got along well. Hammond also commentates on other track and field events shown on NBC. At the Winter Olympics, Hammond is the main commentator for figure skating and ice dancing. Hammond is sort of unique in that, unlike most of his NBC Sports colleagues, he does not live in or around the New York City area, opting to stay in his hometown of Lexington, a decision he made during his early days at NBC. Hammond isn't alone in this choice; despite being a New York native himself, Costas lives in St. Louis, Missouri.

Hammond was considered the leading play-by-play candidate when NBC won the bidding for Sunday night NFL coverage beginning with the 2006 season, but ended up losing out to former ABC announcer Al Michaels after the latter signed with NBC. Hammond teamed with Cris Collinsworth to call the secondary Saturday Wild Card playoff game for NBC each year, including Chiefs-Colts in January 2007, Redskins-Seahawks in 2008, and Falcons-Cardinals in 2009, but teamed with Joe Gibbs and Joe Theismann for the Jets-Bengals Wild Card playoff game in January 2010, as Cris Collinsworth partnered with Al Michaels in the 2009 season due to the retirement of John Madden after the 2008 season. Hammond also filled in for Bryant Gumbel as play-by-play announcer on the NFL Network's December 13, 2007 game featuring the Denver Broncos and Houston Texans on Thursday Night Football, once more teaming with Collinsworth. 

Hammond and Collinsworth also serve as the announcing team on the Madden NFL video game in 2009 and 2010. and Madden NFL 10. The game is notable for how he mispronounced the name of then-Oakland Raiders cornerback Nnamdi Asomugha.

Hammond's work at NBC also included play-by-play commentary for The NBA on NBC and The NFL on NBC. He called gymnastics, figure skating, the WNBA, the Orange Bowl and college basketball.

Health
By the early 2000s, Hammond's health had deteriorated. On March 24, 2001, less than two months before NBC was supposed to broadcast the Kentucky Derby for the very first time, he underwent an operation for diverticulitis, a disease that affects the colon. During the surgery, a portion of Hammond's colon was removed. However, even with the short amount of time between the Derby and his operation, Hammond managed to get healthy enough to make his dream of broadcasting his home state's most famous sporting event become a reality on May 5, 2001.

In October 2002, he underwent open-heart surgery, missing the Breeders' Cup that year. Bob Costas took Hammond's place at the hosting desk. It was the only Breeders' Cup Hammond was not a part of until 2006, when ESPN had their first year of coverage.

Personal life
Hammond and his wife, Sheilagh, have three grown children, sons David and Christopher and daughter Ashley. David has followed in his father's footsteps, becoming a radio commentator for Syracuse University's basketball and football teams and working as a play-by-play announcer for The AFL on NBC.

Honors and awards
Hammond has been awarded horse race broadcasting's top honor, the Eclipse Award (Media category), in 1984 and 1996. He was awarded an Emmy Award for coverage of the 1992 Breeder's Cup. He also won Emmys for sports broadcasting in 1988 (men's and women's basketball), 1992 (Olympics coverage of track and field and diving), and 1996 (Olympics Track and Field).

He was the first recipient of the annual Outstanding Kentuckian Award given by the A.B. Chandler Foundation, is a charter member of the Lafayette High School Hall of Fame and has been inducted into the Kentucky Journalism Hall of Fame, University of Kentucky Hall of Distinguished Alumni and Kentucky Sports Hall of Fame.  Inducted into the KY Pro Football HOF in 2006.

Career timeline
1967–1970: WVLK (AM) sports director
1970–1980: WLEX-TV sports director
1980–1983: SEC men's basketball play-by-play, TVS Television Network
1984–1986: SEC men's basketball play-by-play, Lorimar Sports Network
1984–2016: Reporter and host, Thoroughbred Racing on NBC
1985–1998: College Basketball on NBC play-by-play
1985–1997, 2006–2011: NFL on NBC play-by-play
1987–2009: SEC men's basketball play-by-play, Raycom Sports
1992–1997, 2000–2012: Notre Dame Football on NBC play-by-play
1992–2001: NBA on NBC play-by-play
1992–2018: Olympics on NBC (track & field, figure skating & speed skating)

References

1944 births
Living people
American horse racing announcers
American television sports announcers
ArenaBowl broadcasters
Arena football announcers
College basketball announcers in the United States
Figure skating commentators
Gymnastics broadcasters
Miami Dolphins announcers
National Basketball Association broadcasters
National Football League announcers
Notre Dame Fighting Irish football announcers
Olympic Games broadcasters
Sportspeople from Lexington, Kentucky
Syracuse Orange football announcers
Track and field broadcasters
University of Kentucky College of Agriculture, Food, and Environment alumni
Women's National Basketball Association announcers